Gabriel Johnson (born 1980 in Santa Clara, California) is an American trumpeter whose music combines aspects of electronica and jazz.

Reception
Robert Christgau gave Fra_ctured an A− grade, writing that "[Johnson's] horn has crystallized more ace electronica experiments than any other traditional instrument," adding that "his sound and his backdrops are bigger and hotter than his predecessors". David Luhrssen of the Shepherd Express wrote that the album "conjures switched-on '70s progressive rock along with percolating electro-funk and copy-and-paste Pro Tools jazz," and wrote that Johnson was "obviously in the school" of Miles Davis. Andrew Frey in reviewing the album for Maximum Ink wrote of Johnson: "Born on the whims and whimsy of quirky electronica, this phenom trumpeter has found liberating fields of instrumental bliss through jubilant Pro Tools antics and his own 'fractured jazz' notions." Tom Hull of The Village Voice described the album as "Bold swathes of soundtrack electronica, burnished with bolts of trumpet."

Discography
Fra_ctured (Electrofone, 2010)
Introducing Gabriel Johnson (Sunset Horn, 2012)
Alone Together (Sunset Horn, 2014)
Sketches Volume 1 (Sunset Horn, 2016)
Sketches Volume 2 (Sunset Horn, 2016)
Sketches Volume 3 (Sunset Horn, 2016)
Sketches Volume 4 (Sunset Horn, 2016)
Winter Beats (Sunset Horn, 2022)
Sunset 08 (Sunset Horn, 2022)
Silent One (Sunset Horn, 2022)
Quarantine Moonshine (Sunset Horn, 2022)
Monterey Mysterey (Sunset Horn, 2022)
Blur (Sunset Horn, 2022)
Night Music Volume 1 (Sunset Horn, 2022)
Film Music Volume 1 (Sunset Horn, 2022)
Mulholland (Sunset Horn, 2022)
Sunday Sessions-Volume 1 (Sunset Horn, 2022)
Sunday Sessions-Volume 2 (Sunset Horn, 2022)
Sunday Sessions-Volume 3 (Sunset Horn, 2022)

References

External links

1980 births
Living people
American trumpeters
American male trumpeters
American electronic musicians
Jazz musicians from California
New England Conservatory alumni
People from Santa Clara, California
21st-century trumpeters
21st-century American male musicians
American male jazz musicians